An  -extractor is a bipartite graph with  nodes on the left and  nodes on the right such that each node on the left has  neighbors (on the right), which has the added property that

A disperser is a related graph. 

An equivalent way to view an extractor is as a bivariate function 

 

in the natural way.

Extractor functions were originally researched as a way to extract randomness from weakly random sources. See randomness extractor.

Using the probabilistic method it is easy to show that extractor graphs with really good parameters exist. The challenge is to find explicit or polynomial time computable examples of such graphs with good parameters. Algorithms that compute extractor (and disperser) graphs have found many applications in computer science.

References
 Ronen Shaltiel, Recent developments in extractors - a survey

Graph families
Pseudorandomness
Theoretical computer science